Eucithara solida is a small sea snail, a marine gastropod mollusk in the family Mangeliidae.

Description
The length of the shell attains 7 mm. The purplish shell is solid. It is very closely granosely latticed throughout.

Distribution
This marine species is found off the Philippines.

References

External links
  Tucker, J.K. 2004 Catalog of recent and fossil turrids (Mollusca: Gastropoda). Zootaxa 682:1-1295.

solida
Gastropods described in 1846